Dryophilus is a genus of beetles in the family Ptinidae. There are about eight described species in Dryophilus.

Species
These species belong to the genus Dryophilus:
 Dryophilus anobioides Chevrolat, 1832 g
 Dryophilus densipilis Abeille de Perrin, 1872 g
 Dryophilus forticornis Abeille de Perrin, 1875 g
 Dryophilus longicollis (Mulsant & Rey, 1853) g
 Dryophilus luigionii Pic, 1921 g
 Dryophilus pusillus (Gyllenhal, 1808)
 Dryophilus rufescens Pic, 1921 g
 Dryophilus siculus Ragusa, 1896 g
Data sources: i = ITIS, c = Catalogue of Life, g = GBIF, b = Bugguide.net

References

Further reading

 
 
 
 
 

Ptinidae